The 3rd Michigan Cavalry Regiment was a cavalry regiment that served in the Union Army during the American Civil War.

Service
The 3rd Michigan Cavalry was organized at Grand Rapids, Michigan, between August 24 and November 28, 1861.

Private James H. Robinson of Company B would later be awarded the Medal of Honor for his bravery at a fight at Brownsville, Arkansas, on January 27, 1864.

The regiment was mustered out of service on March 15, 1866.

Total strength and casualties

The regiment suffered 3 officers and 27 enlisted men killed in action or mortally wounded and 4 officers and 380 enlisted men who died of disease, for a total of 414 
fatalities.

Commanders
 Colonel John Kemp Mizner

See also
List of Michigan Civil War Units
Michigan in the American Civil War

Notes

References
The Civil War Archive

Cavalry
1865 disestablishments in Michigan
Military units and formations disestablished in 1865
1861 establishments in Michigan
Military units and formations established in 1861
Military units and formations disestablished in 1866